Indebank was a commercial bank in Malawi. It derived its name from Investment and Development Bank of Malawi Limited, the original name at the time of its founding. Indebank is one of the commercial banks licensed by the Reserve Bank of Malawi, the national banking regulator.

Indebank ceased to operate on 30 April 2016 and its operating assets and liabilities were acquired by National Bank of Malawi effective 1 May 2016. Indebank's banking licence was
consequently surrendered to the central bank.

Overview
The bank was a medium-sized financial services provider in Malawi. , the bank's total assets were valued at approximately US$79 million (MWK:12.8 billion), with shareholders' equity of approximately US$13.1 million (MWK:2.1 billion). The Malawian Government was the largest shareholder in the bank. Indebank maintains three subsidiaries:

 Indetrust Holdings Limited: 51% shareholding - Real estate leasing 
 Indetrust Limited: 100% shareholding - Pension fund manager
 Indebank Financial Services Limited: 100% shareholding - Currently dormant

History
Indebank was established in 1972. In the beginning, the institution was a development bank. In 2001, Indebank transformed into a commercial bank following the issuance of a commercial banking license. In June 2010, TransAfrica  Holdings Limited, a private equity firm based in Mauritius divested its 41.38% shareholding in Indebank. That ownership interest was acquired by the Government of Malawi at an undisclosed sales price. The government had indicated its desire to sell its interest in Indebank at an IPO on the Malawi Stock Exchange in the future.

Ownership
The bank's stock was owned by the following corporate entities:

Branch network
The bank maintained nine (9) branches, five (5) of which, are full service branches in the metropolitan areas of Blantyre, the business capital and of Lilongwe, the political capital of Malawi. The remaining four (4) agency branches are located in the towns of Mponela, Salima, Luchenza and Karonga.

See also
 List of banks in Malawi
 Reserve Bank of Malawi
 Economy of Malawi

References

External links
   Website of Indebank
 Website of Reserve Bank of Malawi
 Company Profile At Mbendi.com

Banks of Malawi
Banks established in 1972